Buns and Guns was a fast-food restaurant in Sfeir, a southern suburb of Beirut, Lebanon in a Hezbollah controlled area. The restaurant's theme was military decor, fake assault rifles, and camouflage netting, as well as recorded gunfire sounds.  The dishes were served with names of "rocket-propelled grenade" (chicken on a skewer) and other names like Kalashnikov, Dragunov, Viper, and B52.  Their motto was "A sandwich can kill you."

References

Fast-food chains of Lebanon
Restaurants in Lebanon